McGuffie is a surname. Notable people with the surname include:

Bill McGuffie (1927–1987), British composer
Craig McGuffie (born 1997), Scottish footballer
Louis McGuffie (1893–1918), Scottish World War I Victoria Cross recipient
Ryan McGuffie (born 1980), Scottish footballer
Sam McGuffie (born 1989), American football player
Sheila McGuffie (1911–2007), English aeronautical engineer
Walter McGuffie (1916–1996), British Olympic wrestler
Will McGuffie (born 2000), English footballer